Moorland School is a selective independent day and boarding school situated in the Ribble Valley, Clitheroe in North West England.

Boarding schools in Lancashire
Private schools in Lancashire
Educational institutions established in 1940
Schools in Clitheroe
1940 establishments in England
Member schools of the Independent Schools Association (UK)